Gianni Averaimo (born 10 September 1964) is an Italian former water polo player who competed in the 1988 Summer Olympics and in the 1992 Summer Olympics.

See also
 Italy men's Olympic water polo team records and statistics
 List of Olympic champions in men's water polo
 List of Olympic medalists in water polo (men)
 List of men's Olympic water polo tournament goalkeepers
 List of world champions in men's water polo
 List of World Aquatics Championships medalists in water polo

References

External links
 

1964 births
Living people
Italian male water polo players
Water polo goalkeepers
Olympic water polo players of Italy
Water polo players at the 1988 Summer Olympics
Water polo players at the 1992 Summer Olympics
Olympic gold medalists for Italy
Olympic medalists in water polo
Medalists at the 1992 Summer Olympics
Water polo players from Genoa